Daniel Patrick Reilly (born May 12, 1928) is an American prelate of the Roman Catholic Church.  Reilly served as bishop of the Diocese of Norwich in Connecticut from 1975 to 1994 and as bishop of the Diocese of Worcester in Massachusetts from 1994 to 2004.

Biography

Early life and education
Daniel Reilly was born on May 12, 1928, in Providence, Rhode Island, to Francis and Mary Ann (née O'Beirne) Reilly. He entered Our Lady of Providence Seminary in Warwick, Rhode Island, in 1943, then in 1948 went to the Grand Seminary in Saint-Brieuc, France.

Ordination and ministry
Reilly was ordained to the priesthood for the Diocese of Providence on May 30, 1953 by Bishop Russell McVinney at the Cathedral of Sts. Peter and Paul in Providence.After his ordination, Reilly briefly served in a parish before completing his graduate studies at Boston College.

Reilly was named assistant chancellor (1954), secretary to Bishop McVinney (1956), chancellor (1964), and vicar general (1972). Reilly attended two sessions of the Second Vatican Council in Rome, and was raised to the rank of monsignor in 1965.

Bishop of Norwich

On June 5, 1975, Pope Paul VI appointed Reilly as the third bishop of the Diocese of Norwich. He received his episcopal ordination on August 6, 1975, at the Cathedral of Saint Patrick in Norwich by Archbishop John Whealon, with Bishops Vincent Hines and Louis Gelineau serving as co-consecrators.

Bishop of Worcester
On October 27, 1994, Pope John Paul II appointed Reilly as the fourth bishop of the Diocese of Worcester. He was installed on December 8, 1994.During his tenure in Worcester, Reilly reopened St. Joseph Parish but merged it with Notre Dame des Canadiens Parish in Worcester. He raised over $50 million for his Forward in Faith campaign to place the diocese in a stable financial condition.

In 2002, Reilly became the first Catholic bishop to open the annual synod of the Evangelical Lutheran Church in America. In 2003, he expressed his unequivocal opposition to same-sex marriage and civil unions but declared that he was open to discussion on giving public benefits to same-sex couples.

Retirement
On March 9, 2004, John Paul II accepted Reilly's resignation as bishop of the Diocese of Worcester. He was succeeded by Bishop Robert McManus, then-auxiliary bishop of Providence.

On September 17, 2012, the Diocese of Norwich reached a $1.1 million settlement with a New London, Connecticut, woman who claimed that she had been sexually abused as a minor by Thomas Shea, a priest at St. Joseph Parish in New London.  The woman claimed that Reilly, when bishop of Norwich, knew about Shea's history of abuse allegations, but kept transferring him to different parishes.

On December 30, 2020 the newspaper The Day calculated that Reilly and the Diocese of Norwich faced 35 separate lawsuits by men who had been abused during the 1990's as minors.  The men all accused K. Paul McGlade, a monk who ran the Academy at Mount Saint John in Deep River, Connecticut. Reilly had served on the school board that recruited McGlade to Norwich from Australia.

See also
 
 Catholic Church hierarchy
 Catholic Church in the United States
 Historical list of the Catholic bishops of the United States
 List of Catholic bishops of the United States
 Lists of patriarchs, archbishops, and bishops

References

External links 

Roman Catholic Diocese of Worcester Official Site
Official site of the Holy See

Episcopal succession

1928 births
Living people
American Roman Catholic clergy of Irish descent
Boston College alumni
Roman Catholic bishops of Norwich
Roman Catholic bishops of Worcester, Massachusetts
Roman Catholic Diocese of Providence
Clergy from Providence, Rhode Island
20th-century Roman Catholic bishops in the United States
21st-century Roman Catholic bishops in the United States
Religious leaders from Connecticut